19-Epivoacristine is an indole alkaloid found in different species of Tabernaemontana, such as Tabernaemontana dichotoma, as well as in Peschiera affinis. It is also known as 20-epivoacangarine and 19-epi-voacangarine.

Potential pharmacology 
19-Epivoacristine may be a selective acetylcholinesterase (AChE) inhibitor in vitro.

Chemistry
19-Epivoacristine can be prepared by potassium borohydride reduction of voacryptine.

See also 
 Voacristine
 Voacamine
 Apparicine
 Lochnericine

References 

Indole alkaloids
Alkaloids found in Apocynaceae